Clive Barker (born 1952) is a British horror writer, director, and artist.

Clive Barker may also refer to:

 Clive Barker (editor) (1931–2005), theater coach and academic
Clive Barker (artist, born 1940), British pop artist
 Clive Barker (soccer) (born 1944), South African soccer player and coach

See also
 Barker (disambiguation)
 Clive (disambiguation)